The Tang dynasty of China administered territory using a hierarchical system of three descending divisions: circuits (dào 道), prefectures (zhōu 州), and counties (xiàn 縣). Prefectures have been called jùn (郡) as well as zhōu (州) interchangeably throughout history, leading to cases of confusion, but in reality their political status was the same. The prefectures were furthered classified as either Upper Prefectures (shàngzhōu 上州), Middle Prefectures (zhōngzhōu 中州), or Lower Prefectures (xiàzhōu 下州) depending on population. An Upper Prefecture consisted of 40, 000 households and above, a Middle Prefecture 20, 000 households and above, and a Lower Prefecture anything below 20, 000 households. Some prefectures were further categorized as bulwark prefectures, grand prefectures, renowned prefectures, or key prefectures for strategic purposes. A superior prefecture was called a fu (府).

The scope and limits of each circuit's jurisdiction and authority differed greatly in practice, and often individual circuit inspectors' powers and autonomy grew to a point that the administrative system became popularly known as the "Three Divisions of Falsehood" (虛三級). As Tang territories expanded and contracted, edging closer to the period of Five Dynasties and Ten Kingdoms, administrative records of these divisions became poorer in quality, sometimes either missing or altogether nonexistent. Although the Tang administration ended with its fall, the circuit boundaries they set up survived to influence the Song dynasty under a different name: lù (路).

History

Emperor Taizong (r. 626−649) set up 10 "circuits" (道, dào) in 627 as areas for imperial commissioners to monitor the operation of prefectures, rather than as a direct level of administration. In the early Tang these geopolitical entities were not based on the realities of governance but rather ease of use when communicating which areas were to be monitored by the imperial commissioners. Prefects answered directly to the central government until the mid Tang dynasty when circuits took on new governmental responsibilities. In 639, there were 10 circuits, 43 commanderies (都督府, dūdū fǔ), and 358 prefectures (州 and later 府, fǔ). In 733, Emperor Xuanzong expanded the number of circuits to 15 by establishing separate circuits for the areas around Chang'an and Luoyang, and by splitting the large Shannan and Jiangnan circuits into two and three new circuits respectively. He also established a system of permanent inspecting commissioners, though without executive powers. In the year 740 CE, the administrative establishments of the Tang dynasty reached 15 circuits, 328 prefectures, and 1573 counties. Under the reforms of Emperors Zhongzong, Ruizong, and Xuanzong, these circuits became permanent administrative divisions. Circuits were assigned a number of permanent imperial commissioners of varying purposes and titles starting around the year 706 CE.

The Tang dynasty also created military districts (藩鎮 fānzhèn, meaning "buffer town") controlled by military commissioners known as jiedushi, charged with protecting frontier areas susceptible to foreign attack (similar to the European marches and marcher lords). Commanderies, (都督府, dūdū fǔ, literally "Office of the Commander-Governor"), which were border prefectures with a more powerful governor while prefecture (州, Zhōu) was the more common name for an inland secondary levels of administration. Dudu Fu was shortened to Fu, and the convention developed that larger prefectures would be named fu, while smaller prefectures would be called zhou. This system was eventually generalized to other parts of the country as well and essentially merged into the circuits. The greater autonomy and strength of the commissioners permitted insubordination and rebellion which led to the Five Dynasties and Ten Kingdoms period.

Administration

The underlying principle of administration in the early Tang was to make administrative units so small that no locality could threaten or contest the dynasty's stability.

The primary level of administration was the prefecture, the zhōu (州), and had an average size of 25,650 households or 146,800 people.

The secondary level of administration was the district county, the xiàn (縣), and had an average population of roughly 30,000.

Officials assigned to these units were directly answerable to the imperial government and forbidden from amassing any personal armed forces. Officials were also restricted from serving in their native prefecture where clan ties and personal connections could jeopardize their loyalty to the court. To prevent officials from gaining personal power or local bonds the imperial government transferred them periodically to new localities. The same rules applied to the officials' immediate subordinates. The main purpose of these officials was to ensure taxes were sent to the central government, and in return the government sent back as much money as it deemed was appropriate for local needs. For these officials during most of the Tang era, posts outside the capital, even important ones, were treated as a form of exile.

Despite the transient role of these officials, there was a certain level of continuity within the local administration, imposed not by ambitious officials, but by petty subordinate officers who never rose above their regional stations. These men handled the majority of daily government affairs and were the indispensable repositories of local knowledge, usage, and administrative precedent that their superiors relied upon. As such the role they played cannot be exaggerated, for the customs of law and usage were considerably varied in Tang times. In numerous regions the magistrate could not even understand the speech of the people he administrated so he came to depend on his petty officers. Owing to the nature of their skills and knowledge, these posts tended to be hereditary, and office holders often became small but unique social groups. Although indispensable to the magistrates, it is unlikely that they represented the interests of their locality wholeheartedly or at all, since they too were dependent on the imperial government for prestige and power. Autonomy was not their primary concern.

More regional society could be found outside the walls of prefectural or districts towns among the powerful landowning clans of the countryside. Unlike petty officers, these clans formed an integral portion of rural society. Social networks included not just powerful clans but also small farmers, tenants, and tradesmen. Prefects, who typically employed a staff of only 57 men to administer 140,000 people, had to rely on the influence of these great clans to arbitrate disputes and preserve stability in the countryside. These clans represented a distinctively local interest, but were not necessarily ungenerous or hostile to centralized power, for the courts' officers served as protectors for their possessions and passed a large portion of the tax burden on to their poorer neighbors. In addition, the threat of imperial retribution was usually enough to keep such local magnates in line.

Military Regionalism

While the Tang government remained firmly in control this system worked as designed. However, in the years leading up to and following the An Lushan rebellion, changes in military organization enabled regional powers along the frontier to challenge the authority of the central government. To suppress the revolting powers, the government set up regional commands not only in border provinces but throughout the drainage basin of the Yellow River. By the year 785 the empire had divided into roughly forty provinces or dào (道) and their governors allotted wider powers over subordinate prefectures and districts. The province became another level of administration between the weakened central government and the prefectural and district authorities.

In the post-Ān Lùshān period, approximately 75% of all provincial governors were military men regardless of their titles and designations. Out of these, four of the most powerful military governors rebelled in Hebei. In return for their surrender, they were allowed to remain in command of their armies and to govern large tracts of land as they saw fit. In the year 775, Tian Chengsi of Weibo Jiedushi attacked and absorbed a large portion of Xiangzhou from Zhaoyi Jiedushi, resulting in the "three garrisons of Hebei": Youzhou (Yuzhou (modern Beijing)/Fanyang), Chengde (Rehe) ruled by Li Baochen, and Weibo. Although nominally subordinate to the Tang by accepting imperial titles, the garrisons governed their territories as independent fiefdoms with all the trappings of feudal society, establishing their own family dynasties through systematic intermarriage, collecting taxes, raising armies, and appointing their own officials. What's more, several of the leading military governors in Hebei were non-Chinese.

The Tang court sometimes tried to intervene when a governor died or was driven out by one of the frequent mutinies, however the most it achieved was in securing promises of larger shares in tax revenue in exchange for affirming the successor's position. In reality, not even these promises amounted to much, and the court was never able to extract a significant sum from the northeast. Between the period of time from 806 to 820 Emperor Xianzong defeated the independent military governors of Henan and for a short while extended imperial control into the north. Afterwards the Hebei armies acquiesced to court appointees, but these were soon driven out by mutinies.

The semi-autonomous nature of Hebei was not just a matter of elite politics at play, or else it would not have lasted so long, but was rather based on a fundamental and widely held separatist sentiment in the Hebei armies that had existed since the province's occupation by the Khitans dating back to the 690s. While the Tang court officials argued that the Khitans' success was partially due to local collaboration, accounts imply that bitter feelings of perceived betrayal by the Chang'an administration lingered for decades.

After military defeats suffered against the Tibetans in 790 resulting in the complete loss of the Anxi Protectorate, the northwestern provinces around Chang'an subsequently became the Tang's true frontier and was garrisoned personally by the court armies at all times. Military men came to fill governorship offices in these small provinces but owing to the small size of their holdings, provincial decline in productivity, and proximity to the capital, were unable to become autonomous like the provinces of Hebei. Deforestation in the region compounded the increasing soil erosion and desertification, which in turn reduced the amount of agricultural output in the area north and west of the capital. So by this time the armies, like Chang'an itself, depended on grain supplies shipped from the south. Despite their inability to provide self sustenance, they too showed independence in some aspects, and during the 9th century their office holders became a largely hereditary group.

In the Shandong peninsula the powerful Pinglu Jiedushi held power for several decades before the Tang court divided it into three smaller units in the 820s. However the domination of the peninsula by military regionalists persisted.

In Henan pacified rebels ruled as semi-autonomous governors for several decades after the rebellion. Thus Henan became a buffer zone situated between the court and the independent jiedushis occupying the north-east regions of Hebei and Shandong. Because Henan represented a crucial lifeline for the court due to the presence of the Grand Canal which Chang'an depended on for supplies, the Tang court stationed large garrisons in the area in an effort to keep the Henan jiedushis under control. These efforts were generally ineffective and the garrisons suffered repeated mutinies by their soldiers in the last decades of the eighth century. Only in the second decade of the 9th century did Xianzong restore effective administration to the region after a series of campaigns, but by then Henan had been depopulated by constant warfare and strife, so that it too came to rely on southern grain.

In a sense, these autonomous provinces operated in many ways like miniature replicas of the Tang realm, with their own finances, foreign policy, and bureaucratic recruitment and selection procedures. They were not, however, without attachments to the Tang court. Probably due to the fiercely competitive political environment, the governors of Youzhou, Chengde, and Weibo often depended on the legitimacy afforded by court sponsorship, something the ninth-century chief minister Li Deyu understood, "Although the armies in Hebei are powerful, their leaders cannot stand on their own; they depend on the orders of appointment from court to assuage their troops". The Hebei leaders saw themselves and the realms they ruled as similar polities to the great lords of the preimperial Warring States Period. Even during periods of open revolt against the state, like in late 782, the governors never denied the emperor's role, and instead proclaimed themselves "kings" - a title unambiguously lower in hierarchy to that of "emperor" in Chinese political thought. In these instances, the provincial bureaucracies temporarily converted into "feudal" courts and hierarchies, fully aware of the Warring States terminology which they employed.

Collapse of the Administration

Some 20 years after Emperor Wuzong's death, the Tang empire began its last phase of collapse. The source of the downfall can be traced to an event in 868 when a group of soldiers in Gui Prefecture (Guangxi) under Pang Xun rebelled after the government ordered them to extend their garrison duty for one extra year, even though they had already served six years on what was supposed to be a three-year assignment. The rebellion spread northwards to the Chang Jiang and Huai River before its suppression in 869 by Shatuo cavalry under the command of Li Guochang. While the Tang court was still smarting from the impact of the Pang Xun rebellion, in 874, a salt trader by the name of Wang Xianzhi stirred up another rebellion in Changyuan, Puzhou, Henan. In 875 Wang was joined by Huang Chao, who eventually took over leadership of the rebel army when Wang died in 878. The cataclysmic Huang Chao rebellion was one of such vast magnitude that it shook the very foundations of the Tang empire, destroying it both internally as well as cutting off any pre-existing foreign contacts it had with the outside world. At the rebellion's peak, Huang claimed to command an army of one million. It swept through much of the lower and middle Yangzi valleys, devastated the Central Plains, and went as far south as Guangzhou (879). After sacking the twin capitals Luoyang in 880 and Chang'an the following year, Huang Chao declared the founding of his Great Qí (大齊) dynasty.

The court made slow progress in stamping out the rebellion due in large extent to the deterioration of central authority. The reigning sovereign Tang Xizong was subject to constant manipulation by eunuch officers like Tian Lingzi. Although the rebellion was finally defeated in 884, the court continued to face challenges posed by the warlords—officially military commissioners who held enormous regional power, including Li Maozhen in Fengxiang (Qizhou, Jingji 京畿), Li Keyong in Taiyuan (Bingzhou, Hedong), Wang Chongrong in Hezhong (Puzhou, Hedong), and Zhu Wen in Bianzhou, Henan. The country was constantly torn by the tug-of-war between the eunuchs and the warlords. The eunuchs used their physical control of the emperor as leverage to stay in power and carry out their agenda. The warlords wanted to purge the court of eunuch influence. Against this hopeless backdrop, the penultimate sovereign of Tang, Zhaozong, ascended the throne in 888, and although a man of lofty ambition, he remained throughout his reign a mere puppet in the machinations of court politics.

With the extermination of the court eunuchs in 903, the warlord Zhu Wen obtained absolute authority over the emperor. Since Zhu's core holdings were in Henan, he forced Zhaozong to move east to Luoyang in 904, where he was killed. The great city of Chang'an was abandoned and its structures dismantled for their building materials, never again attaining the strategic importance and prestige it presided over for the last millennium. Three years later in 907, the Tang empire officially came to a close when Zhu Wen dethroned its last sovereign.

Tang dynasty circuits

* Circuits established under Xuanzong, as opposed to Taizong's original ten circuits.

** Circuits established under Xuanzong by dividing Taizong's Jiangnan and Shannan circuits.

Other Tang-era circuits include the West Lingnan, Wu'an, and Qinhua circuits.

Protectorates

dūhùfǔ = DHF = 都護府 = Protectorate

dūdūfǔ = DDF = 都督府 = Commandery/Area Command

Circuits, Prefectures, and Counties

 Circuits (dao; 道) and Military Districts (fanzhen; 籓鎮)
 Prefectures (zhou; 州), Superior Prefectures (fu; 府) and Commanderies (dudufu; 都督府)
 Counties (xian; 縣)

Jingji

Duji

Guannei

Hedong

Henan

Hebei

Shannandong (Shannan East)

Shannanxi (Shannan West)

Longyou

Huainan

Jiangnandong (Jiangnan East)

Jiangnanxi (Jiangnan West)

Qianzhong

Jiannan

Lingnan

See also
 Administrative divisions of the Liao dynasty
 Administrative divisions of the Yuan dynasty

Footnotes

References

 .

 (alk. paper)

  (paperback).
 

 
 .